The Nepalese Police Force is the national police of Nepal. It is independent of the Nepalese Army. Although once brought under the Army in the name of "Unified Command", it is taken as a force separate from the Army.
In the days of its establishment, Nepal Police personnel were mainly drawn from the armed forces of the Nepali Congress Party which fought against feudal Rana autocracy in Nepal.

See also
Nepal Police
Armed Police Force (APF) of Nepal
National Investigation Department (NID) of Nepal
Nepal Army

External links 
 Official site

 
Military of Nepal